China Hualu Group is a Chinese state-owned electronics manufacturer headquartered in Dalian, Liaoning. It was established in Dalian on June 17, 1992, by the joint capital of nine designated video recorder enterprises across the country. It was born for the purpose of building China's video recorder industry.

It had a net revenue in 2006 of US$659.8 million and was ranked No. 43 on a list of Chinese electronics companies sorted on this figure.

In 2021, the South China Morning Post described the company as "an important asset to Beijing".

References

External links
http://www.hualu.com.cn/en/ homepage
https://web.archive.org/web/20070202212526/http://www.edn.com/index.asp?layout=article
http://www.pcworld.com/article/id,136626-c,dvdtechnology/article.html

Government-owned companies of China
Electronics companies of China
Manufacturing companies based in Dalian
Chinese brands
Chinese companies established in 2000
Technology companies established in 2000
Manufacturing companies established in 2000